Enhydrina zweifeli is a species of snakes found from New Guinea to Australia (Northern Territory and Queensland). In the past they were thought to be Enhydrina schistosa, but after DNA testing are now provisionally identified as Enhydrina zweifeli. DNA test have shown they are not related to Enhydrina schistosa.

Enhydrina zweifeli are commonly known as the Sepik beaked seasnake or Zweifel's beaked seasnake. Enhydrina zweifeli is a highly venomous species of sea snake.

Studied Enhydrina zweifeli have been near the mouth of Sepik River of  New Guinea.

References 

 Golay,P, H.M. SMITH, D.G. BROADLEY, J. R. DIXON, C., MCCARTHY, J. C. RAGE, B. SCHÀTTI & M.TORIBA 1993. Endoglyphs and other major venomous snakes of the world. A checklist. Aire-Genève, Azemiops S. A. Herpetological Data Center: i-xv + 1-478.
 Kharin V. E. 1985. A new species of sea snakes of the genus Enhydrina (Serpentes, Hydrophiidae) from waters of New Guinea. [in Russian]. Zoologicheskii Zhurnal 64 (5): 785-787
 Kharin, Vladimir E. and Vladimir P. Czeblukov 2009. A Revision of the Sea Snakes of Subfamily Hydrophiinae. 1. Tribe Disteirini Nov. (Serpentes: Hydrophiidae). Russian Journal of Herpetology 16 (3):183-202

External links 

 
 The Reptile House

Snakes of New Guinea
zweifeli
Reptiles described in 1985
Snakes of Australia
Taxobox binomials not recognized by IUCN